The 2007 World Marathon Cup was the 12th edition of the World Marathon Cup of athletics and were held in Osaka, Japan, inside of the 2007 World Championships.

Results

See also
2007 World Championships in Athletics – Men's Marathon
2007 World Championships in Athletics – Women's Marathon

References

External links
 IAAF web site

World Marathon Cup
World
2007 in Japanese sport
Marathons in Japan
International athletics competitions hosted by Japan